Lake Hotel is used as the name of several hotels including:

 Burj Dubai Lake Hotel and Serviced Apartments
Hot Lake Hotel
Lake Hotel in Yellowstone National Park
Mountain Lake Hotel (Virginia)
Mountain Lake Hotel, New York
Raquette Lake Hotel